Tarung Derajat is a demonstration sport at the 26th Asian Games in Palembang, Indonesia.

2011 Southeast Asian Games events